James "Sandy" Thompson (June 5, 1895 – June 21, 1965) was a Negro league baseball player. He played between 1920 and 1933.

References

External links
 and Baseball-Reference Black Baseball stats and Seamheads

1895 births
1965 deaths
Birmingham Black Barons players
Chicago American Giants players
Pollock's Cuban Stars players
Dayton Marcos players
Milwaukee Bears players